Nadella is a surname found primarily among Telugu-speaking  Brahmin community of Andhra Pradesh.

Notable people
Nadella Purushottama Kavi (1863–1938), Indian scholar, playwright, teacher and editor
Satya Nadella (born 1967), CEO of Microsoft

References

Indian names
Telugu-language surnames